Lothar Schneider (born 3 December 1953) is a former professional German footballer.

Schneider made a total of 81 appearances in the Fußball-Bundesliga for MSV Duisburg and Tennis Borussia Berlin during his playing career.

References 
 

1953 births
Living people
German footballers
Association football midfielders
Bundesliga players
2. Bundesliga players
MSV Duisburg players
Tennis Borussia Berlin players